Roaster may refer to:

 A device for coffee preparation
 A large chicken suitable for roasting
 A device for roasting meat or vegetables, for example:
 Corn roaster
 Convection roaster
 Pig roaster
 Hot Jupiter, a type of extrasolar planet
 One who participates in a roast

See also
 Rocester, a town
 Roadster (disambiguation)
 Rooster (disambiguation)